Eisig Silberschlag (January 8, 1903 – September 30, 1988) was a Galician-born American Hebrew poet, translator, and literary critic. He received the Tchernichovsky Prize in 1951 for his translations of Aristophanes and Menander into Hebrew.

Biography
Eisig (Yitzhak) Silberschlag was born in Stry, eastern Galicia, to Ḥasidic parents Bertha and David Silberschlag. He studied Greek and Latin in the local gymnasium, and was active in the Hashomer Hatzair movement. Silberschlag immigrated with his family to New York City in 1920, publishing his first poem in the weekly Hadar in 1925. That same year he returned to Europe, where he completed a doctorate at the University of Vienna with a dissertation on Anglo-Russian relations during the reign of Catherine the Great.

He died at the age of 85 at St. David's Hospital in Austin, and was buried at the Mount of Olives Cemetery in Jerusalem.

Academic and literary career
In the early 1930s, Silberschlag taught at the Jewish Institute of Religion and at the Teachers Institute of the Jewish Theological Seminary. He published his first volume of poetry, Bi-shevilim bodedim, in 1931. He also edited, along with Aaron Zeitlin, several volumes of the Hebrew quarterly .

Silberschlag joined the faculty of Hebrew College in 1944, rising to become dean, in which role he oversaw the college's accreditation from the New England Association of Schools and Colleges, and then president. Silberschlag was a candidate to succeed Joseph Klausner as chair of modern Hebrew literature at the Hebrew University upon the latter's retirement, but remained in the United States when Simon Halkin was hired in this position.

After his retirement and the death of his wife Milkah, Silberschlag moved from Boston to Austin, Texas, where he was appointed professor of Hebrew literature at the University of Texas at Austin. During this period he also served as president of the National Association of Professors of Hebrew.

Published works

In Hebrew

 
 
 
 

In English

 
 
 
 
 
 Naphtali Herz Imber (1856-1909), Judaism: A Quarterly Journal of Jewish Life and Thought, vol. 5, no. 2, Spring 1956

Translations

References

1903 births
1988 deaths
American Zionists
Burials at the Jewish cemetery on the Mount of Olives
Hebrew-language poets
Jewish American academics
Jewish American poets
Jews from Galicia (Eastern Europe)
Lyric poets
Modern Hebrew writers
People from Stryi
Polish emigrants to the United States
Translators of Ancient Greek texts
Translators to Hebrew
University of Texas at Austin faculty
University of Vienna alumni
Writers from Austin, Texas
Writers from Boston
20th-century American Jews